Martin Hunt (July 9, 1873 – July 22, 1938) was an American Private serving in the United States Marine Corps during the Boxer Rebellion who received the Medal of Honor for bravery.

Biography
Hunt was born July 9, 1873, in the County of Mayo, Ireland and enlisted into the marine corps from Boston, Massachusetts on August 27, 1896. After entering the Marine Corps he was sent to fight in the Chinese Boxer Rebellion.

He received his Medal for his actions in Peking, China from June 20 – July 16, 1900. The Medal was presented to him July 19, 1901.

He was discharged from the marine corps on August 26, 1901, and lived in the Philippines until his death on July 22, 1938.

Medal of Honor citation
Rank and organization: Private, U.S. Marine Corps. Born: 9 July 1873, County of Mayo, Ireland. Accredited to: Massachusetts. G.O. No.: 55, 19 July 1901.

Citation:

In the presence of the enemy during the battle of Peking, China, 20 June to 16 July 1900, Hunt distinguished himself by meritorious conduct.

See also

List of Medal of Honor recipients
List of Medal of Honor recipients for the Boxer Rebellion

References

External links

1873 births
1938 deaths
19th-century Irish people
American military personnel of the Boxer Rebellion
Boxer Rebellion recipients of the Medal of Honor
Irish emigrants to the United States (before 1923)
Irish-born Medal of Honor recipients
Military personnel from County Mayo
United States Marine Corps Medal of Honor recipients
United States Marine Corps non-commissioned officers